The 1976 2. divisjon was a Norway's second-tier football league season.

The league was contested by 28 teams, divided into a total of three groups; A and B (non-Northern Norwegian teams) and one district group which contained teams from Northern Norway: district IX–XI. The winners of group A and B were promoted to the 1977 1. divisjon. The second placed teams in group A and B met the winner of the district IX–XI in a qualification round where the winner was promoted to 1. divisjon. The bottom two teams inn group A and B were relegated to the 3. divisjon. The 8th placed teams in group A and B met each other in a qualification round to avoid relegation. 

Moss won group A with 27 points. Vålerengen won group B with 32 points. Both teams promoted to the 1977 1. divisjon. Bodø/Glimt won the district IX–XI and won the qualification play-offs and was also promoted.

Tables

Group A

Group B

District IX–XI

Play-offs

Promotion play-offs

Results
Odd – Lyn 2–2
Bodø/Glimt – Odd 4–0
Lyn – Bodø/Glimt 1–1

Bodø/Glimt won the qualification round and won promotion to the 1. divisjon.

Play-off table

Relegation play-offs

Results
Aalesund – Nessegutten 0–1
Nessegutten – Aalesund 2–2

Nessegutten won 3–2 on aggregate. Aalesund was relegated to 3. divisjon.

References

Norwegian First Division seasons
1976 in Norwegian football
Norway
Norway